Alexandre Taché may refer to:
Alexandre-Antonin Taché (1823–1894), Canadian Roman Catholic priest and bishop
 Alexandre Taché (politician) (1899–1961), Quebec lawyer, judge and politician